The Charles S. Barrett Building is a historic building in the Merion Village neighborhood of Columbus, Ohio. It was listed on the Columbus Register of Historic Properties in 2006 and the National Register of Historic Places in 2015. The building was completed in 1900 as the home of the city's South High School, part of the Columbus Public School District. It has since been converted into apartments, rented out as The Barrett.

The four-story Italianate school building was designed by David Riebel, as his second school building commission in the neighborhood, after Southwood Elementary School. The South High School building was modeled after the now-demolished East High School at 1390 Franklin Avenue, designed by Riebel about a year earlier. It was redeveloped into apartments in the mid-2010s. A nonprofit housing agency worked with a local developer to build housing around the school building, with a total of 108 apartments and 22 single-family homes. The school building itself was converted into 52 apartments, and its 1960s addition was demolished.

See also
 National Register of Historic Places listings in Columbus, Ohio
 Schools in Columbus, Ohio

References

External links

 Apartment website

Residential buildings on the National Register of Historic Places in Ohio
Residential buildings completed in 1900
National Register of Historic Places in Columbus, Ohio
Columbus Register properties
Schools in Columbus, Ohio